Sugartree is the debut studio album by Swedish pop and country singer Jill Johnson. It was released on 28 March 1996 and includes the singles "Shake the Sugartree" and "All Kinds of People".

Track listing
Shake the Sugartree
As Dreams Go By
The Street Where You Live
It's My House
Can't Get You Out of My Head
Killing Time
All Kinds of People
In My Own Way
Unbreakable Heart
Less of the Same
Jag Skulle så Gerna Vilja Gifte Meg
There'll Be Pork in the Treetops Come Morning

Contributors
Jill Johnson, vocals
Jan Lysdahl, drums, keyboard, guitar, bass
Mikael Henderson - keyboard

References

External links

1996 debut albums
Jill Johnson albums